Miss India Worldwide 2003 was the 13th edition of the international beauty pageant. The final was held in San Francisco, California, United States on  September 27, 2003. About 21 countries were represented in the pageant. Purva Merchant  of India was crowned as the winner at the end of the event.

Results

Special awards

Delegates
 – Rashi Chandhok
 – Sweta Joshi 
 – Shalini Vasdani 
 – Priscilla Solanki 
 – Kiranne Devi 
 – Laavanya Ambur
 – Sheetal Viroomal
 – Anjali Punjabi
 – Purva Merchant
 – Shraysi Tandon
 – Rakhi Shah
 – Shrila Jagessar
 – Pooja Chitgopekar
 – Sujeeta Menon 
 – Shabnam Mohammed
 – Pinky Shamdasani 
 – Nadya Nandanie Ramnath 
 – Fenulla Jiwani
 – Sahiba Singh
 – Neelam Salhotra
 – Meghna Nagarajan

Crossovers
Contestants who previously competed or will compete at other beauty pageants:
Miss Earth
2007: :  Pooja Chitgopekar (Placement: Miss Earth Air)

References

External links
http://www.worldwidepageants.com/

2003 beauty pageants